SS Ben Lomond was an 1872 twin screw steamer plying the waters of Lake Wakatipu in New Zealand. For some years she was the oldest vessel on Lloyd's Register.

The vessel was launched as the Jane Williams at Queenstown on 10 February 1872 and registered at Dunedin on 26 March the same year. The vessel's name was changed to Ben Lomond, after the mountain of the same name, on 12 May 1886. She was withdrawn from service on 30 June 1951 and sunk off Kingston Bay on 28 October 1952. The SS Ben Lomond worked with her sister ships, the paddle steamers Antrim and Mountaineer and the screw steamer Earnslaw, transporting sheep, cattle and passengers to the surrounding high country stations.

Notes

Ships built in New Zealand
Ferries of New Zealand
Steamships of New Zealand
1872 ships
Queenstown, New Zealand